Civar Çetin (born 1 January 1992) is a Turkish professional footballer who currently plays for Amed SK.

Career

Çetin signed his first professional contract on 23 June 2008 and made his domestic league debut on 3 December 2010. Çetin has also earned one cap for the Turkey U-18 squad.

References

External links

1992 births
Living people
People from Derik
Turkish footballers
Turkey youth international footballers
Bucaspor footballers
Batman Petrolspor footballers
Kahramanmaraşspor footballers
Süper Lig players
TFF First League players
TFF Second League players
Kurdish sportspeople
Association football midfielders